The Cima Park Fire Guard Station near Douglas, Arizona was built in 1934 by the Civilian Conservation Corps.  It was listed on the National Register of Historic Places in 1993 for its architecture, which is "vernacular, log" architecture.  It was designed by the USDA Forest Service and served as institutional housing.  The listing included four contributing buildings (a cabin, a toolshed, an outhouse, and a barn) on a  area.

It is located on Greenhouse Trail in the Chiricahua Mountains.  The station was built to serve as a headquarters camp for fire crews who could be dispatched to fight fires based upon telephone reports from fire lookouts.  The telephone operator also was the cook.

References

United States Forest Service architecture
Civilian Conservation Corps in Arizona
Park buildings and structures on the National Register of Historic Places in Arizona
Government buildings completed in 1934
Buildings and structures in Cochise County, Arizona
1934 establishments in Arizona
Residential buildings on the National Register of Historic Places in Arizona
National Register of Historic Places in Cochise County, Arizona
United States Forest Service firefighting